Rahdar (also Romanized as Rāhdār and Rahdār; also known as Rāhdār Godār) is a village in Rahdar Rural District, in the Central District of Rudan County, Hormozgan Province, Iran. At the 2006 census, its population was 141, in 31 families.

References 

Populated places in Rudan County